Scott Maine (born February 2, 1985) is an American professional baseball relief pitcher. He played in Major League Baseball with the Chicago Cubs and Cleveland Indians from 2010 to 2012.

Early years
Maine was born and raised in Palm Beach Gardens, Florida, where he attended William T. Dwyer High School. He then attended the University of Miami and played college baseball for the Miami Hurricanes. In 2006, he played for the Brewster Whitecaps of the Cape Cod League and was named a league all-star.

Career

Seattle Mariners
Maine was drafted by the Seattle Mariners in the 15th round of the 2003 MLB draft out of high school, but did not sign.

Colorado Rockies
He was drafted by the Colorado Rockies in the 23rd round of the 2006 MLB draft as a junior, but did not sign.

Arizona Diamondbacks
He was drafted by the Arizona Diamondbacks in the sixth round of the 2007 MLB draft, and signed. Maine played in 8 games for Short-Season Yakima in 2007, going 1-0 with a 6.10 ERA and 1 save, striking out 20 in 10.1 innings. Maine played 2008 with the A-Advanced Visalia Oaks, where in 32 games, he went 3-2 with a 3.19 ERA and 5 saves, striking out 53 in 48 innings. Maine played the 2009 season with Double-A Mobile until he was promoted to Triple-A Reno for the last month of the minor league season. In 48 total games, he went 4-5 with a 2.90 ERA and 7 saves, striking out 61 in 62 innings. Following the 2009 season, Maine was traded by the Diamondbacks with Ryne White to the Chicago Cubs for Aaron Heilman. He also played for the Scottsdale Scorpions of the Arizona Fall League.

Chicago Cubs
Maine was added to the Cubs roster and promoted on August 27, 2010, and made his MLB debut the same day. He split 2010, 2011 and 2012 with the Cubs and Triple-A Iowa. In 3 seasons with the pro team, Maine had a 4.87 ERA in 41 games while striking out 42 in 40.2 innings.

Cleveland Indians
Maine was claimed off waivers by the Cleveland Indians on August 29, 2012, and made his debut with the team on September 8. In 9 games with the Indians, Maine had a 10.50 ERA while striking out 6 in 6 innings.

Toronto Blue Jays
The Toronto Blue Jays claimed Maine off waivers from the Indians on October 31, 2012. 8 days later, Maine was designated for assignment to make room for the recently acquired Jeremy Jeffress.

Miami Marlins
On November 14, 2012, Maine was claimed off waivers by the Miami Marlins. He began the year with Triple-A New Orleans, but was released on July 20 after throwing 20 games in the Marlins organization, 9 of them on a rehab assignment with the GCL Marlins. In those 20 games, he had a 4.19 ERA with 3 saves, striking out 26 in 19.1 innings.

Bridgeport Bluefish
On March 18, 2014 he signed with the Bridgeport Bluefish of the Atlantic League of Professional Baseball.

Cincinnati Reds
On June 30, 2014 Maine signed a minor-league deal with the Cincinnati Reds. He was released on August 7, 2014.

Vaqueros Laguna
Maine signed with Vaqueros Laguna prior to the 2015 season. He was released early in the season on April 2, 2015.

Return to Bridgeport
Maine resigned with the Bridgeport Bluefish. This was his second stint with the Bluefish after playing for them during the 2014 season. He was released from the Bluefish in July.

Southern Maryland Blue Crabs
On March 31, 2016, Maine signed with the Southern Maryland Blue Crabs of the Atlantic League of Professional Baseball. He became a free agent after the 2016 season.

Sugar Land Skeeters
On May 30, 2017, Maine signed with the Sugar Land Skeeters of the Atlantic League of Professional Baseball. He became a free agent after the 2017 season.

Ottawa Champions
On March 9, 2018, Maine signed with the Ottawa Champions of the Can-Am League. He was released following the season on December 13, 2018.

References

External links

1985 births
Living people
American expatriate baseball players in Canada
American expatriate baseball players in Mexico
Baseball players from Florida
Brewster Whitecaps players
Bridgeport Bluefish players
Chicago Cubs players
Cleveland Indians players
Columbus Clippers players
Estrellas Orientales players
American expatriate baseball players in the Dominican Republic
Indios de Mayagüez players
Iowa Cubs players
Major League Baseball pitchers
Mexican League baseball pitchers
Miami Hurricanes baseball players
Mobile BayBears players
New Orleans Zephyrs players
Ottawa Champions players
Pensacola Blue Wahoos players
People from Palm Beach Gardens, Florida
Reno Aces players
Scottsdale Scorpions players
Southern Maryland Blue Crabs players
Sugar Land Skeeters players
Tennessee Smokies players
Vaqueros Laguna players
Visalia Oaks players
Yakima Bears players